Shahrestaneh Rural District is a rural district (dehestan) in Now Khandan District, Dargaz County, Razavi Khorasan Province, Iran. At the 2006 census, its population was 5,047, in 1,288 families.  The rural district has 20 villages.

References 

Rural Districts of Razavi Khorasan Province
Dargaz County